The Napoleon Museum in Monte Carlo, Monaco was a museum of artifacts which once belonged to the French Emperor Napoleon I.

Location and exhibits
The museum, which was attached to the Prince of Monaco's palace, contained a collection assembled by Prince Louis II, the great-grandfather of the present Prince of Monaco. The collection contained numerous possessions of the Emperor including letters and documents pertaining to his reign and conquest of Europe and relics from his exile and imprisonment on Saint Helena. Also included in the collection was clothing that belonged to Napoleon's son, Napoleon II.

Items of historical importance relating to the Principality of Monaco were displayed on a mezzanine floor in the museum, including the Charter of Independence of Monaco that was given royal assent by King Louis XII of France.

The museum was established in its final location in 1970.

The collection of Napoleonic effects was sold at auction in 2014 to raise funds for renovations to the Prince's Palace. A bicorne hat worn by Napoleon sold for 1.9 million euros at the auction.

References

External links
The Museum of Napoleon 

1970 establishments in Monaco
2014 disestablishments in Monaco
Museums established in 1970
Museums disestablished in 2014
Museums in Monaco
Defunct museums
Monaco
History of Monaco